Andrea Zambonin (Vicenza, 3 September 2000) is an Italian rugby union player.
His usual position is as a Lock and he currently plays for Zebre in United Rugby Championship.

Zambonin also represented Calvisano in the 2019–20 European Rugby Challenge Cup as Additional Player.

In 2019 and 2020, Zambonin was named in the Italy Under 20 squad.  On the 14 October 2021, he was selected by Alessandro Troncon to be part of an Italy A 28-man squad for the 2021 end-of-year rugby union internationals.

On the 7 February 2022, Zambonin was selected by Kieran Crowley to be part of Italy squad for the 2022 Six Nations Championship. He made his debut against England.

References

External links 

Ultimate Rugby Profile

2000 births
Living people
Italian rugby union players
Rugby union flankers
Rugby Calvisano players
People from Vicenza
Zebre Parma players
Rugby union locks
Italy international rugby union players